The 1939 Troy State Red Wave football team represented Troy State Teachers College (now known as Troy University) as a member of the Alabama Intercollegiate Conference (AIC) and the Southern Intercollegiate Athletic Association (SIAA) during the 1939 college football season. Led by third-year head coach Albert Choate, the Red Wave compiled an overall record of 7–4, with a mark of 3–0 in AIC play, winning the conference title. Troy State had a record of 2–3 against SIAA opponents, tying for 22nd place.

Schedule

References

Troy State
Troy State
Troy Trojans football seasons
Alabama Collegiate Conference football champion seasons
Troy State Red Wave football